Preston Park  may refer to:
In UK
 Preston Park, Brighton
Preston Park railway station, Brighton
 Preston Park (Brent), London
 Preston Park, Stockton-on-Tees
In USA
 Preston Park, Pennsylvania
 Preston Park, Roanoke, Virginia